David Arden is an Australian guitar player, singer and songwriter. He has performed with Archie Roach, Ruby Hunter, Tiddas, Bart Willoughby, Mixed Relations and with members of Shane Howard, Paul Kelly, Not Drowning Waving and Hunters and Collectors. He is currently a member and co Musical Director of The Black Arm Band.

Arden has released one album called Kookatha / Gunditjmara Clan which he says took 20 years to make. The album was produced by Shane Howard and Arden and featured contributions by Howard, Amy Saunders, Helen Mountfort, Rose Bygrave, and Bart Willoughby.

Arden has been involved in the Koori Visible project, which saw the release of an album by Tjudi, a band led by Arden.

Discography

Albums

Extended Plays

Awards and nominations

Music Victoria Awards
The Music Victoria Awards are an annual awards night celebrating Victorian music. They commenced in 2006.

! 
|-
| Music Victoria Awards of 2016
| Dave Arden
| Best Indigenous Act
| 
|rowspan="1"| 
|-

References

External links
Dave Arden Website
The Black Arm Band bio

Indigenous Australian musicians
Australian guitarists
Australian male singers
Living people
Year of birth missing (living people)
Australian male guitarists